Gordon Taylor Logan (born 3 October 1949) is a Scottish former footballer who played at right-back for Port Vale, Kettering Town and Bo'ness United. He helped Port Vale to win promotion out of the Fourth Division in 1969–70. His father was footballer Rennie Logan and his son, Grant Logan, played lawn bowls.

Career
The son of former Hibernian and Falkirk footballer Rennie Logan, Logan attended Broxburn High School, played for Tynecastle Athletic and captained the county schools team to the final of the Scottish Schools' Cup. At the age of 16, he was signed to the Port Vale junior team by manager Stanley Matthews in June 1966. He captained the "Valiants" reserve team and played in the team that reached the FA Youth Cup quarter finals. He also won three caps for Scotland youth. He signed professional forms with the club in March 1967. He played seven Fourth Division games towards the end of the 1966–67 season. He played 17 matches in the 1967–68 campaign, though Matthews came into trouble when it was revealed that Logan had been paid illegal bonuses. He featured just four times in the 1968–69 season, as he fell out of favour under new boss Gordon Lee. Logan played nine league and five FA Cup games in the 1969–70 promotion campaign, and scored his first senior goal on 13 September, in a 3–2 win over Oldham Athletic at Boundary Park. He was given a free transfer to Southern League side Kettering Town in May 1970. He then returned to Scotland to become a police officer in the summer of 1971 and also signed for SJFA side Bo'ness United, featuring regularly at right-back for a team that reached the finals of the Brown Cup & R L Rae Cup that season.

Family
His father, Rennie Logan, and his son, Grant Logan, both represented Scotland at lawn bowls.

Career statistics
Source:

Honours
Port Vale
Football League Fourth Division fourth-place promotion: 1969–70

References

Footballers from Edinburgh
Officers in Scottish police forces
Scottish footballers
Scotland youth international footballers
Association football fullbacks
Port Vale F.C. players
Kettering Town F.C. players
Bo'ness United F.C. players
English Football League players
Southern Football League players
Scottish Junior Football Association players
Scottish police officers
1949 births
Living people